Winstead may refer to:

Places
 Clay, Kentucky, briefly known as Winstead in the 19th century

People
 Charles Winstead (1891–1973), one of the three FBI agents who shot and killed John Dillinger
 Lizz Winstead (born 1961), American comedian, radio and television personality, and blogger
 Mary Elizabeth Winstead (born 1984), American actress
 Nash Winstead (1925–2008), North Carolina State University assistant professor and administrator in various positions
 W. Arthur Winstead (1904–1995), U.S. Representative from Mississippi
 Wendy Winstead (?–1990), American veterinarian and author
 Doodles Weaver (1911–1983), born Winstead Sheffield Weaver, American actor and comedian

Other uses
 Winstead PC, a law firm headquartered in Dallas, Texas
 Winstead House (disambiguation), several buildings in the United States
 Winstead's, a hamburger chain based in Kansas City, Missouri

See also
 Wanstead, a suburban area in London
 Winsted (disambiguation)
 Winstedt, a surname